was a professional wrestling event promoted by DDT Pro-Wrestling (DDT). The event took place on August 18, 2013, in Tokyo at the Ryōgoku Kokugikan. The event featured ten matches, four of which were contested for championships. The event aired on Fighting TV Samurai.

Storylines
The Ryōgoku Peter Pan 2013 event featured ten professional wrestling matches that involved different wrestlers from pre-existing scripted feuds and storylines. Wrestlers portrayed villains, heroes, or less distinguishable characters in the scripted events that built tension and culminated in a wrestling match or series of matches.

By winning the King of DDT tournament on July 7, Harashima earned a title match in the main event against KO-D Openweight Champion Shigehiro Irie.

Event
The second dark match saw the team of Sanshiro Takagi, Toru Owashi and Akebono take on the team of Jun Kasai from Pro-Wrestling Freedoms, Antonio Honda and Hoshitango for a spot in the KO-D 6-Man Tag Team Championship match taking place later on the main card.

Similarly, the first match of the main card was a four-way tag team match to determine the next challengers to the KO-D Tag Team title who would go on to face the champions at the Who's Gonna Top? 2013 event on September 29. This match saw the participation of Yuji Hino from Kaientai Dojo who teamed up with Daisuke Sasaki.

The next match was the "Souken Group Presents Ironman Heavymetalweight Championship Battle Royale", a Rumble rules match for the Ironman Heavymetalweight Championship. Kōmyō, a painting by Akihiro Miwa, was the 972nd champion heading into the match. It was accompanied by Shuji Ishikawa and Seiya Morohashi who served as its bodyguards. During the match, DJ Nira pinned Kōmyō to eliminate it from the match and become the 973rd champion. Last entrant Akihiro, an inflatable love doll, then eliminated DJ Nira thus winning the match and becoming the 974th champion.

The next match saw the debut of Saki Akai teaming with Masa Takanashi and Cherry against the team of Yoshiko from World Wonder Ring Stardom, Hikaru Shida from Ice Ribbon and Hiroshi Fukuda.

The next match was a special singles match between Katsuhiko Nakajima from Diamond Ring and Konosuke Takeshita.

In the next match, Sanshiro Takagi, Toru Owashi and Akebono, having won first contendership earlier, challenged the team of Kensuke Sasaki, the founder and owner of Diamond Ring, Danshoku Dino and Makoto Oishi for their KO-D 6-Man Tag Team Championship title.

The first match of the double main event saw the then IWGP Heavyweight Champion Kazuchika Okada from New Japan Pro-Wrestling take on Kota Ibushi in a singles match.

Results

Rumble rules match

Footnotes

References

External links
The official DDT Pro-Wrestling website
Ryōgoku Peter Pan 2013 at ProWrestlingHistory.com

DDT Peter Pan
2013 in professional wrestling
August 2013 events in Japan
Professional wrestling in Tokyo
2013 in Tokyo
Events in Tokyo